The 1969 Kansas City Chiefs season was the team's tenth, their seventh in Kansas City, and the final season of the American Football League (AFL). It resulted in an 11–3 regular season record and three postseason road victories, including a 23–7 victory in Super Bowl IV over the NFL's heavily favored Minnesota Vikings.

After two close losses to division rival Oakland in the regular season, the visiting Chiefs upset the Raiders in the final AFL Championship Game, claiming their third AFL title. The Chiefs were led by head coach Hank Stram, quarterback Len Dawson, and a powerful defense led by Bobby Bell, Willie Lanier, Buck Buchanan, Emmitt Thomas, Johnny Robinson, and Curley Culp. The Chiefs' defense became the fourth defense in the history of pro football to lead its league in fewest rushing yards, fewest passing yards and fewest total yards. The Chiefs were the second AFL team to win the Super Bowl and last AFL team to do so before the AFL-NFL Merger in the following season.

The season was marred not only by an injury to quarterback Len Dawson, but also controversy surrounding Dawson and his purported involvement in a sports gambling ring. Back-up quarterback Mike Livingston and the Chiefs' stellar defense led the Chiefs back to the Super Bowl, this time, to win it all.

Along with owner Lamar Hunt, nine future Hall of Famers were members of the 1969 Chiefs, including QB Len Dawson, LB Willie Lanier, LB Bobby Bell, DT Buck Buchanan, DT Curley Culp, CB Emmitt Thomas, S Johnny Robinson, K Jan Stenerud, and head coach Hank Stram.

In 2006, the 1969 Kansas City Chiefs were ranked as the 18th greatest Super Bowl champions on the NFL Network's documentary America's Game: The Super Bowl Champions.

In 2007, ESPN.com ranked the 1969 Chiefs as the seventh-greatest defense in NFL history, noting "Hank Stram's 'Triple Stack' defense, which gave the linebackers lots of room to roam, was superb, holding five opponents to fewer than 10 points and giving up an average of less than two touchdowns a game.... Then they got serious. Against the [defending] Super Bowl champion Jets in the AFL divisional playoff game at Shea Stadium, the Chiefs held on for a 13–6 victory, thanks to a remarkable three-play goal line stand that stifled the Jets on the one. After losing twice to the Raiders during the regular season, the Chiefs allowed a single touchdown, in the first quarter, to win the AFL title over Oakland 17–7. The Chiefs defense then stifled the Vikings in the Super Bowl, allowing only two rushing first downs and picking off three passes in the fourth quarter to win 23–7. Total points against the Chiefs in the playoffs: 20." Kansas City is the only team in the Super Bowl era to win the title without allowing as much as 10 points in any postseason game.

The Chiefs did not return to or win the Super Bowl again until Super Bowl LIV in the 2019 season.

Offseason

1969 AFL Draft
In the first round of the 1969 AFL Draft, the Chiefs selected cornerback Jim Marsalis from Tennessee State. Marsalis became an immediate starter at cornerback alongside veteran Emmitt Thomas. He was the only Chiefs rookie to start for the 1969 team, as Ed Podolak and Bob Stein were benched, and Morris Stroud and Jack Rudnay sat out the season with injuries.

Roster

Regular season
The Chiefs began the regular season with four consecutive road games for the only time in team history, due to a scheduling conflict with the Kansas City Royals about usage of Municipal Stadium.
After a decisive 27–9 win at San Diego (9/14), the club posted a 31–0 shutout at Boston (9/21), but QB Len Dawson sustained a knee injury against the Patriots.  The once-optimistic picture for the Chiefs went from bad to worse the following week when backup QB Jacky Lee went down with a broken ankle in a 24–19 loss at Cincinnati (9/28). That injury left the team's most crucial position in the hands of second-year QB Mike Livingston, who took just five snaps as a rookie in ‘68.

However, Livingston engineered a five-game winning streak, while getting plenty of help from the club's defense. The team's home opener at Municipal Stadium was played in a daylong deluge referred to as a "frog-strangler" by Chiefs radio broadcaster Bill Grigsby. The Chiefs and Oilers combined for 14 fumbles in a 24–0 Kansas City victory (10/12).

Dawson returned to the starting lineup in a 27–3 win vs. San Diego (11/9) and guided the club to three wins in the season's next four games. Denver Broncos coach Lou Saban was infuriated following the Chiefs 31–17 win vs. Denver (11/27). Trailing 24–17 late in the game, Denver attempted an onside kick that was recovered by LB Bobby Bell, who promptly returned that kick for a 53-yard TD.  Mike Livingston started the following week vs. Buffalo (12/7) for an again-injured Dawson, who returned for the regular-season finale at Oakland (12/13). A 10–6 loss vs. the Raiders gave the Chiefs an 11–3 record, good for second in the division behind Oakland (12–1–1).

Schedule

Preseason

Regular season

Standings

Game summaries

Week 1

Week 6

Statistics 

–Time of Game: 2:40

Postseason

Schedule

Divisional

    
    
    
    
    

In the 1969 AFL Divisional Playoff Game at the New York Jets (12/20), Kansas City rode its dominating defense which produced a crucial goal-line stand en route to a 13–6 win over the defending Super Bowl champions to set up a rematch with the Raiders in the final AFL Championship Game.

AFL Championship

Super Bowl

The fourth annual AFL-NFL Championship Game, now officially known as the "Super Bowl", was played on January 11, 1970, at Tulane Stadium in New Orleans, Louisiana. The AFL champion Kansas City Chiefs defeated the NFL champion Minnesota Vikings, 23–7.

Even though the Vikings were 13-point favorites coming into the game, the Chiefs defense dominated the game by limiting the Minnesota offense to only 67 rushing yards, forcing 3 interceptions, and recovering 2 fumbles. The victory by the AFL evened the Super Bowl series with the NFL at two games apiece.

Kansas City's Len Dawson became the fourth consecutive winning quarterback to be named Super Bowl MVP. He completed 12 of 17 passes for 142 yards and one touchdown, with 1 interception. Dawson also recorded 3 rushing attempts for 11 yards.

The Vikings began the game by taking the opening kickoff and marching from their own 20-yard line to the Kansas City 39-yard line, but were forced to punt. The Chiefs then drove 42 yards in 8 plays to score on kicker Jan Stenerud's Super Bowl record 48-yard field goal. (According to Dawson, the Vikings were shocked that the Chiefs would attempt a 48-yard field goal. "Stenerud was a major factor", he said.) Minnesota then managed to reach midfield on their next drive, but were forced to punt again.

On the first play of their ensuing drive, Chiefs quarterback Len Dawson threw a 20-yard completion to wide receiver Frank Pitts,  followed by a 9-yard pass to wide receiver Otis Taylor.  Four plays later, on the first play of the second quarter, a pass interference penalty on Vikings defensive back Ed Sharockman nullified Dawson's third down incompletion and gave Kansas City a first down at the Minnesota 31-yard line. However, on third down and 4 at the 25-yard line, Vikings cornerback Earsell Mackbee broke up a deep pass intended for Taylor. Stenerud then kicked another field goal to increase the Chiefs lead to 6–0.

On the second play of their next drive, Vikings wide receiver John Henderson fumbled the ball after catching a 16-yard reception, and Chiefs defensive back Johnny Robinson recovered the ball at the Minnesota 46-yard line.  But the Vikings made key defensive plays. First defensive tackle Alan Page tackled running back Mike Garrett for a 1-yard loss, and then safety Paul Krause intercepted Dawson's pass at the 7-yard line on the next play.

However, the Vikings also could not take advantage of the turnover.  Quarterback Joe Kapp's two incompletions and a delay of game penalty forced Minnesota to punt from their own 5-yard line. The Chiefs then took over at the Viking 44-yard line after punter Bob Lee's kick only went 39 yards. A 19-yard run by Pitts on a reverse play then set up another field goal by Stenerud to increase the Chiefs' lead to 9–0.

On the ensuing kickoff, Vikings returner Charlie West fumbled the ball, and Kansas City's Remi Prudhomme recovered it at Minnesota 19-yard line.  Defensive tackle Jim Marshall sacked Dawson for an 8-yard loss by on the first play of the drive, but then a 13-yard run by running back Wendell Hayes and a 10-yard reception by Taylor gave the Chiefs a first down at the 4-yard line.  Two plays later, running back Mike Garrett's 5-yard touchdown run gave Kansas City a 16–0 lead. The play call was “65 Toss Power Trap”, which became a classic play call in NFL history. It was heard because head coach Hank Stram was wearing a microphone for NFL Films, making him the first person to ever do that.

West returned the ensuing kickoff 27 yards to the 32-yard line.  Then on the first play of the drive, Kapp completed a 27-yard pass to Henderson to advance the ball to the Kansas City 41-yard line.  However, on the next 3 plays, Kapp threw 2 incompletions and was sacked by defensive tackle Buck Buchanan for an 8-yard loss.  Then on fourth down, kicker Fred Cox's 56-yard field goal attempt fell short of the goal posts.

In the third quarter, the Vikings managed to build some momentum. After forcing the Chiefs to punt on the opening possession of the second half, Minnesota drove 69 yards in 10 plays to score on fullback Dave Osborn's 4-yard rushing touchdown to cut the lead, 16–7. However, Kansas City responded on their next possession with a 6-play, 82-yard drive to score on Dawson's 46-yard touchdown completion to Taylor three minutes later.

The Chiefs would then go on to shut out the Vikings in the fourth quarter, forcing three interceptions on three Minnesota possessions, to clinch the 23–7 victory. The defeat was total for the Vikings, as even their "Indestructible" quarterback Joe Kapp had to be helped off the field in the fourth quarter after being sacked by Chiefs defensive lineman Aaron Brown.

Garrett was the top rusher of the game, recording 11 carries for 39 yards and a touchdown. He also caught 2 passes for 25 yards and returned a kickoff for 18 yards.  Taylor was the Chiefs' leading receiver with 6 catches for 81 yards and a touchdown.  Kapp finished the game with 16 of 25 completions for 183 yards, with 2 interceptions.  Henderson was the top receiver of the game with 7 catches for 111 yards.

This was the last game where the winner was awarded the World Championship Game Trophy, as later that fall the trophy was renamed the Vince Lombardi Trophy due to Lombardi's death and the AFL-NFL Merger.

AFL All-Star Game
The Chiefs sent nine players to the American Football League All-Star game to represent the AFL West.

Bobby Bell
Buck Buchanan
Ed Budde
Curley Culp
Len Dawson
Robert Holmes
Willie Lanier
Mike Livingston
Jim Marsalis
Jim Tyrer

References

External links
1969 Kansas City Chiefs on Database Football

Kansas City Chiefs seasons
American Football League championship seasons
Super Bowl champion seasons
Kansas City Chiefs
Kansas